Dr. Jekyll y el Hombre Lobo (Dr. Jekyll and the Wolfman), also known as Dr. Jekyll and the Werewolf, is a 1971 Spanish horror film, the sixth in a series of 12 films about the werewolf Count Waldemar Daninsky, played by Paul Naschy. Naschy actually plays a triple role in the film, portraying Waldemar Daninsky, the Wolf Man and Mr. Hyde. This was Naschy's 2nd film working with director Leon Klimovsky, following their hugely successful 1970 collaboration La Noche de Walpurgis. This film also featured Euro-Horror star Jack Taylor, Mirta Miller and the beautiful Shirley Corrigan of England. The film failed however to reach the box office success of Walpurgis.

The film was in production from November to December 1971. The film was released in Spain on November 13, 1972 as Dr. Jekyll y el Hombre Lobo, in the U.S. in 1973 as Dr. Jekyll and the Wolfman, and in Germany in 1974 as Night of the Bloody Wolves. It was released in the UK in 1973 as Dr. Jekyll and the Werewolf.

It was followed by a 1973 sequel, El Retorno de Walpurgis (aka Curse of the Devil).

Plot
A young, wealthy Spanish landowner, Waldemar Daninsky, aka "El Hombre Lobo" (The Wolfman), searches for a cure to his lycanthropy. He travels to London to consult with the infamous Dr. Henry Jekyll's grandson. The doctor prescribes a serum that transforms the werewolf into a bestial Hyde-like personality. It is theorized that Mr. Hyde's superhuman ego will sublimate Daninsky's werewolf identity and eradicate it.

Unfortunately, the procedure results in an even more savage monster than before, since the werewolf only killed against his will, but Mr. Hyde actually enjoys the sadistic acts he commits. The violence is over the top in the scenes where Mr. Hyde ties up two women and brutally whips them nearly to death. The film also contains some unusual transformation scenes, one wherein Daninsky turns into the Wolf Man in a stalled elevator in which he is trapped with a young nurse, and another where he transforms in the middle of a crowded discotheque illuminated by weird strobe light effects.

Henry Jekyll winds up getting stabbed to death by Sandra, a jilted lab assistant/ lover, and the Wolf Man is shot dead with silver bullets, fired by Justine, a woman who loved him enough to end his torment.

Cast
 Paul Naschy as Waldemar Daninsky/Wolfman/Mr. Hyde
 Jack Taylor as Dr. Henry Jekyll
 Shirley Corrigan as Justine
 Mirta Miller as Sandra, Jekyll's lab assistant
 José Marco as Imre Kosta
 Luis Induni as Otvos, the local village gang leader 
 Luis Gaspar as Thurko, Otvos's thug 
 Bernabe Barta Barri as Gyogyo, the innkeeper
 Elsa Zabala as Uswika Bathory, Waldemar's guardian
 Lucy Tiller as whore
 Jorge Vico as party guest
 Adolfo Thous as party guest
 Monteserrat Julió as Agatha, a party guest
 Marisol Delgado as Nurse in elevator

Production
Famed Euro-horror star Jack Taylor was praised for his "wonderfully nuanced performance" as Dr. Henry Jekyll.

This was the only time that the two sets of characters, Jekyll/Hyde and the Wolf Man, appeared together in the same movie.

Release
Two different versions of the film were made, a somewhat censored, clothed version for Spanish theaters and an international "unclothed" version to be distributed outside of Spain. The uncensored version was released on DVD  by Code Red (on a double disc with The Vampires' Night Orgy), and the "clothed" edition was released on a British DVD by Mondo Macabro.

External links

References 

1971 films
1970s monster movies
Dr. Jekyll and Mr. Hyde films
1971 horror films
Films directed by León Klimovsky
Spanish werewolf films
Films scored by Antón García Abril
Waldemar Daninsky series
1970s Spanish-language films